Connected is a 2022 Filipino youth-oriented romantic comedy film directed by Theodore Boborol, starring former Pinoy Big Brother: Connect housemates Kobie Brown, Andi Abaya, Ralph Malibunas, Gail Banawis, Chico Alicaya, Amanda Zamora, and PBB co-host Richard Juan as they navigate all their different personalities while finding a sense of purpose, love, attention, and the struggle to combat feelings of isolation in a connected world.

It is also the first movie produced by Star Magic Studios, serving as the newly-formed studio's realization of its vision to produce movies that will showcase its artists' talents in the most perfect yet challenging roles for them.

Premise 
With a desire to connect to something "greater than themselves," three different stories from Gen Z or Zoomers are formed because of a connection by a café which prohibits them from using social media and their gadgets, and faced and felt the agony and pleasure of being in love.

Cast

Main cast 
 Kobie Brown as Topher
 Andi Abaya as Gabbie
 Ralph Malibunas as Gen
 Gail Banawis as Fin
 Chico Alicaya as Rocky
 Amanda Zamora as Sandy
 Richard Juan as Sky

Supporting cast 
 Peewee O' Hara as Yayay Juaning
 Justin Cuyugan as Lorenz Toledo
 Che Ramos-Cosio as Mira Toledo
 Marife Necesito as Gabbie's mother
 Jonic Magno as Gabbie's father
 Skyzx Labastilla as Gen's mother
 Russu Laurente as Paul

Production 
According to Star Magic and ABS-CBN Entertainment Production Head Laurenti Dyogi, Star Magic Studios is one of the exciting plans for Star Magic’s 30th year anniversary, with this being the maiden offering of the new film sub-company.

Casting 
It was revealed that Brown, Abaya, Malibunas, Banawis, Alicaya, Zamora, and Juan were handpicked by Dyogi himself to star in the movie, and is considered the group's first starring roles in a film.

Release 
Connected was released worldwide on July 22, 2022, via iWantTFC, KTX.ph, SKY Pay-Per-View, and TFC IPTV.

Theatrical
The movie had its theatrical release on the same day of its worldwide release, with Boborol and the main cast except Abaya and Banawis gracing the red carpet event. The event was also attended by Dyogi, and some former Pinoy Big Brother housemates from previous seasons.

Marketing
The movie's full trailer was released on June 24, 2022, on ABS-CBN Entertainment's social media accounts.

Critical response 
Fred Hawson, writing for KTX.ph, described writer Mary Rose Colindres's concept as "(woving) three stories of young love into the mix," and who "was also able to weave in a little detail about a lost pin with a motivational message which worked its magic with everyone, and this was very ingenious." Hawson also went on to describe Abaya and Alicaya as showing "the most promise so far" among the six neophyte actors.

References

External links 
 

Filipino-language films
Philippine romantic comedy films

2022 films